Lissett is a village and former civil parish, now in the parish of Ulrome, in the Holderness area of the East Riding of Yorkshire, England.

In 1823 Lissett, with a population of 95, was in the parish of Beeford, and the Wapentake and Liberty of Holderness. A chapel of ease existed in the village. On 1 April 1935 the parish was abolished and merged with Ulrome.

In 1942 an RAF station, RAF Lissett, was built there. Its main role was to serve as a bomber airfield for the Halifax Bomber 158 Squadron. It had a short life - the final mission left the airbase on 25 April 1945. The airfield is now part of a small industrial estate in the village.

The village church, St James, is a Grade II listed building and houses the oldest dated bell in England, dated 1254. Perhaps of 14th-century origin, it was rebuilt by Hugh Roumieu Gough in 1876. Remaining from the previous church are fragments of a Norman capital in the east wall. The east stained glass window is by Charles Eamer Kempe, with Morris-style diamond-shaped flower details and lettering.

References

External links

 Church of St James, Lissett

Official RAF Lissett website
RAF Lissett history

Villages in the East Riding of Yorkshire
Former civil parishes in the East Riding of Yorkshire
Holderness